The Cotabato Foundation College of Science and Technology (CFCST) is located in Barangay Doroluman, Arakan, Cotabato. CFCST is commonly known as Foundation College being born from the orphanage school, the then Children's Educational Foundation Village (CEFV).

References

State universities and colleges in the Philippines
Universities and colleges in Cotabato
Mindanao Association State Colleges and Universities Foundation